Alexandra Podryadova (born 11 May 1989) is a Kazakhstani judoka from Shymkent who competes in the women's 48 kg category. At the 2012 Summer Olympics, she was defeated in the second round.

References

External links
 
 

Kazakhstani female judoka
Living people
Olympic judoka of Kazakhstan
Judoka at the 2012 Summer Olympics
People from Shymkent
Kazakhstani people of Russian descent
Judoka at the 2010 Asian Games
1989 births
Asian Games competitors for Kazakhstan
20th-century Kazakhstani women
21st-century Kazakhstani women